Filip Ivanovski (born 1 May 1985) is a footballer from Macedonia who currently assistant coach for Macedonian club Vardar.

Club career
Ivanovski made his name in Poland with Polonia Warsaw and on 11 March 2008, he scored one goal in the match between Foreign Stars of Orange Ekstraklasa and Poland national football team. His debut for Polonia was vs. Wisla Krakow (0:2) on 16 August 2008. His first goal for Polonia was the next match on 23 August 2008 vs. ŁKS Łódź (2:1) in the 85th minute.

Ivanovski's contract with Polonia expired in the summer of 2010 and he decided to continue his career in Cyprus by signing a 1-year deal with an option for an additional year with Ethnikos Achnas.

After Ethnikos Achnas Ivanovski travelled to FK Vardar in Macedonia for a season, scoring 24 goals in 32 games and just shortly to make a transfer to the squad of FC Astana playing in Kazakhstan Premier League where he also spent just one season. Then Ivanoski returned to his old youth club FK Vardar between 2014 and 2016. After that he returned to another old youth club of his career in Macedonia, FK Rabotnichki.

On 7 July 2017, Ivanovski signed for Javor Ivanjica in the Serbian SuperLiga. On 4 April 2018, Ivanovski signed for Finnish club RoPS until July 2018, with an option to extend the deal until the end of the year.

International career
He made his senior debut for Macedonia in a June 2009 FIFA World Cup qualification match against Iceland in which he immediately scored a goal and has earned a total of 8 caps, scoring 1 goal. His final international was a May 2012 friendly match against Angola.

International goals

Honours
2006 - Macedonian Cup2007 - Polish Cup, Ekstraklasa Cup2008 - Ekstraklasa Cup

FK Vardar
First Macedonian Football League: 1
Winner: 2011–12
Winner: 2014–15

References

External links
 Profile at MacedonianFootball.com 
 
 

1985 births
Living people
Footballers from Skopje
Association football forwards
Macedonian footballers
North Macedonia international footballers
FK Rabotnički players
FK Makedonija Gjorče Petrov players
Dyskobolia Grodzisk Wielkopolski players
Polonia Warsaw players
Ethnikos Achna FC players
FK Vardar players
FC Astana players
FK Javor Ivanjica players
Rovaniemen Palloseura players
FK Belasica players
Kokkolan Palloveikot players
Macedonian First Football League players
Ekstraklasa players
Cypriot First Division players
Kazakhstan Premier League players
Serbian SuperLiga players
Veikkausliiga players
Macedonian expatriate footballers
Expatriate footballers in Poland
Macedonian expatriate sportspeople in Poland
Expatriate footballers in Cyprus
Macedonian expatriate sportspeople in Cyprus
Expatriate footballers in Kazakhstan
Macedonian expatriate sportspeople in Kazakhstan
Expatriate footballers in Serbia
Macedonian expatriate sportspeople in Serbia
Expatriate footballers in Finland
Macedonian expatriate sportspeople in Finland